Mount Lemmon Survey (MLS) is a part of the Catalina Sky Survey with observatory code G96.

It is currently one of the most prolific surveys worldwide, especially for discovering near-Earth objects. MLS ranks among the top discoverers on the Minor Planet Center's discovery chart with a total of more than 50,000 numbered minor planets.

History 
Andrea Boattini and the survey accidentally rediscovered 206P/Barnard-Boattini, a lost comet, on 7 October 2008. The comet has made 20 revolutions since 1892 and passed within 0.3–0.4 AU of Jupiter in 1922, 1934 and 2005. This comet was also the first comet to be discovered by photographic means, by the American astronomer Edward Emerson Barnard, who did so on the night of 13 October 1892.

On 12 January 2008, Mount Lemmon Survey discovered the near-Earth asteroid  at an apparent magnitude of 21 using a  reflecting telescope.

 was discovered by the Mount Lemmon Survey on 27 September 2009 and it is a stable  Mars trojan asteroid.
 The survey also discovered the unusual Aten asteroid , a dynamically cold Kozai resonator, on 31 March 2012.

See also 
 List of astronomical observatories
 
 Mount Lemmon
 2017 XX61

References

External links 
 NEODyS

Astronomical surveys

Discoverers of comets
Astronomical observatories in Arizona